Davidson County Schools is a School district in Davidson County, North Carolina. The administrative education board is headquartered just off of U.S. Highway 64 on County School Road just outside the city limits of Lexington, North Carolina. The school system comprises seven high schools, seven middle schools, eighteen elementary schools, one extended day school, one ungraded special school, and a STEM based career academy. The superintendent is Dr. Emily Lipe. 
Two other school districts, Lexington City Schools and Thomasville City Schools, are also found in Davidson County.

Schools

Elementary schools
Brier Creek Elementary (Thomasville)
Churchland Elementary  (Churchland)
Davis-Townsend Elementary (Lexington, Holly Grove)
Denton Elementary (Denton)
Fair Grove Elementary (Thomasville)
Friedberg Elementary (Arcadia)
Friendship Elementary (Wallburg)
Hasty Elementary (Thomasville)
Midway Elementary (Midway)
Northwest Elementary (Arcadia)
Pilot Elementary (Pilot)
Reeds Elementary (Reeds)
Silver Valley Elementary (Silver Valley)
Southwood Elementary (Lexington, Linwood)
Southmont Elementary (Southmont)
Tyro Elementary (Tyro)
Wallburg Elementary (Wallburg)
Welcome Elementary (Welcome)

Middle schools
E. Lawson Brown Middle (Thomasville)
Central Davidson Middle (Lexington)
Ledford Middle (Wallburg)
North Davidson Middle (Welcome)
Oak Grove Middle (Midway)
South Davidson Middle (Denton)
Tyro Middle (Tyro)

High schools
Central Davidson High School (Lexington)
Davidson County High School (Lexington)
Davidson Early College (Lexington) 
East Davidson High School (Thomasville)
Ledford High School (Wallburg)
North Davidson High School (Welcome)
Oak Grove High School (Midway)
South Davidson High School (Denton)
West Davidson High School (Tyro)

Non-Traditional schools
Stoner-Thomas School (Lexington)
Yadkin Valley Regional Career Academy (Lexington)

References

External links
 

Education in Davidson County, North Carolina
School districts in North Carolina